Willy Birgel (19 September 1891 – 29 December 1973), born Wilhelm Maria Birgel, was a German theatre and film actor.

Career

Birgel began his acting career before World War I on the stage in his native city of Cologne, and came to movies rather late. He was about 43 years old before he got his first major film role as the English Camp Commandant in Paul Wegener's Ein Mann will nach Deutschland (roughly translated A German Wants to Get to Germany or A German Wants to Go Home). This UFA-production that premiered on 26 July 1934, portrays a German engineer living in South America who hears in 1914 of war in Europe. Realising his obligation to his Fatherland, he sets out for Europe, joined by a German comrade. The journey to Germany involves physical hardships, treacherous terrain, and hostile seas, obstacles faced by patriots who have only one thought: to return home to Germany to help a fatherland under attack. The film spoke of the kind of German values that were emphasized in Nazi Germany.

Similar films made by Birgel for the National Socialist Regime include Unternehmen Michael (1937), Feinde (1940) and Kameraden (1941). In 1937, Reichspropagandaminister Joseph Goebbels named Birgel Staatsschauspieler or roughly Actor of the State, the highest honor Germany had for actors at the time. Besides the propaganda films, Birgel starred in a number of popular movies such as Der Fall Deruga (1938), becoming an unlikely public favorite.

After World War II, Birgel was on the Allied black-list and did not make another film until 1947. By the 1950s, he was back to his pre-war popularity. In the 1960s, Birgel was able to make the transition to television.

Death

Birgel died in 1973 of heart failure at Dübendorf near Zürich. He was buried at the Melaten Cemetery in his birth city, Cologne.

Selected filmography

 A Man Wants to Get to Germany (1934) - English Camp Commandant
 Count Woronzeff (1934) - Petroff, Woronzeffs Sekretär
 Barcarole (1935) - Alfredo Zubaran
 Joan of Arc (1935) - La Trémouille
 One Too Many on Board (1935) - Staatsanwalt Dr. Burger
 Black Roses (1935) - Fürst Abarow
 Schlußakkord (1936) - Garvenberg, Generalmusikdirektor
 The Traitor (1936) - Agent Morris
 Ride to Freedom (1937) - Julek Staniewski
 Men Without a Fatherland (1937) - Baron Falen
 To New Shores (1937) - Sir Albert Finsbury
 Unternehmen Michael (1937) - Major Graf Schellenberg
 Fanny Elssler (1937) - Hofrat Friedrich Gentz
 Faded Melody (1938) - Thomas Gront
 Secret Code LB 17 (1938) - Capt. Arvan Terno
 The Deruga Case (1938) - Dr. Stefan Deruga
 The Blue Fox (1938) - Tabor Vary
 Hotel Sacher (1939) - Stefan Schefczuk
 The Governor (1939) - General Werkonen
 Maria Ilona (1939) - Karl Felix Fürst zu Schwarzenberg
 Congo Express (1939) - Viktor Hartmann
 The Heart of a Queen (1940) - Lord Bothwell
 Enemies (1940) - Keith
 Riding for Germany (1941) - Rittmeister Ernst von Brenken
 Comrades (1941) - Major Karl von Wedell
 Diesel (1942) - Rudolf Diesel
 Der dunkle Tag (1943) - Martin Pauly, Oberstaatsanwalt
 Du gehörst zu mir (1943) - Professor Dr. Burkhardt
The Master of the Estate (1943) - Bernhard von Halleborg
 I Need You (1944) - Prof. Paulus Allmann
 Music in Salzburg (1944) - Anton Klinger
 The Noltenius Brothers (1945) - Wolfgang Noltenius
 Leb' wohl, Christina (1945) - Dr. Petersen
 Between Yesterday and Tomorrow (1947) - Alexander Corty
 In the Temple of Venus (1948) - Dr. Cornelius Riehl
 Chased by the Devil (1950) - Dr. Fingal
 Das ewige Spiel (1951) - Ulrich Campenhausen
 When the Evening Bells Ring (1951) - Albrecht von Finke
 Don't Ask My Heart (1952) - Herr von Birkhausen
 Heidi (1952) - Herr Sesemann / Ludwig Sesemann
 The Chaplain of San Lorenzo (1953) - Catani
 Stars Over Colombo (1953) - Maharadscha von Jailapur Gowan
 The Prisoner of the Maharaja (1954) - Maharadscha von Jailapur Gowan
 Consul Strotthoff (1954) - Konsul Strotthoff
 Captain Wronski (1954) - Rittmeister Wronski
 Heidi and Peter (1955) - Herr Sesemann / Mr. Sesemann
 Ein Mann vergißt die Liebe (1955) - Dr. Kadenberg
 Island of the Dead (1955) - Frank
 Love's Carnival (1955) - Georg von Grobitzsch
 Rosen für Bettina (1956) - Professor Förster
 A Heart Returns Home (1956) - Robert Lennart
 Johannisnacht (1956) - Christian von Hergeth
 Between Time and Eternity (1956) - Prof. Thomas Bohlen
 The Saint and Her Fool (1957) - Fürst von Brauneck
 Doctor Bertram (1957) - Dr. Bertram
 Liebe kann wie Gift sein (1958) - Joachim Köhler
 Le bellissime gambe di Sabrina (1958) - Graf Gottfried
 The Priest and the Girl (1958) - von Gronau
 Arena of Fear (1959) - Cameron, Kunstschütze
 Arzt aus Leidenschaft (1959) - Staatsanwalt Perschke
 When the Bells Sound Clearly (1959) - Graf von Warthenberg
 The Last of Mrs. Cheyney (1961) - Lord Elton
 Die blonde Frau des Maharadscha (1962) - Gowan
 Romance in Venice (1962) - Theodor von Bruggern
 Coffin from Hong Kong (1964) - William Jefferson
 Agent 505: Death Trap in Beirut (1966) - Omar Abdullah
 No Shooting Time for Foxes (1966) - Hunting Author
  (1968) - Public Prosecutor

Further reading 
 Wilhelm Hermann: Willy Birgel: Leben und Dokumente. Reiss-Museum, Mannheim 1987 (Bildhefte des Städtischen Reiss-Museums Mannheim Nr. 7)
 Eberhard Mertens (ed.): Reitet für Deutschland: ein Querschnitt durch einen Erfolgsfilm in Text und Bild; das Willy Birgel Erinnerungsbuch. Olms, Hildesheim 1979 
 H. E. Weinschenk: Schauspieler erzählen, Wilhelm Limpert-Verlag, Berlin 1938, pp. 41ff

External links 
 
 
 Photographs of Willy Birgel

1891 births
1973 deaths
German male film actors
German male stage actors
Actors from Cologne
20th-century German male actors